Telikiai (or Meang) is an islet of Nui atoll in the Pacific Ocean state of Tuvalu. Meang means "west". The islet features in the legends of the Tekaunibiti family, whose members went to catch birds on the islet and found three teanti-ma-aomata (half-spirit and half-human creatures) and captured two.

References

External links
Map of Nui showing Meang

Islands of Tuvalu
Nui (atoll)

gl:Illote Meang
pt:Meang